Reitz Memorial High School or simply Memorial High School (MHS) is an inter-parochial Catholic high school on the east side of Evansville, Indiana. It sits on land bought with money donated by Francis Joseph Reitz in 1922 in memory of his parents, John Augustus and Gertrude Reitz. The school officially opened its doors on January 5, 1925. It is part of the Diocese of Evansville.

History
In 1922 Francis Joseph Reitz pledged one million dollars for the school to be built, for which he was presented with the insignia of Knight and Knight Commander of the Order of Pius IX. The original, main building was built three stories high of Ohio gray brick and elaborate trimmings of Indiana limestone with a Tudor-Gothic design. Classes began on January 5, 1925 with the Brothers of The Holy Cross from Notre Dame University teaching the boys and the Sisters of Providence teaching the girls, each on separate floors.

In 1969, a new addition was completed. The new wing extending along Bennighof Avenue came with expanded first and second floors, a new gym, band room, and library. The new gym could hold up to 2,000 people.

In 1998, a new addition, costing roughly $5 million was added to the western part of the building. The new wing, also known as "the west wing", added eight more classrooms, two art studios, two science labs, a wrestling room, a second, smaller auxiliary gymnasium, and a new media center. The final renovations increased the student capacity to 900 students.

Athletics

To distinguish between two schools named for members of the same family, the IHSAA uses the name Evansville Memorial  instead of Evansville Reitz Memorial, and refers to the older EVSC run FJ Reitz High School as Evansville Reitz. Both schools compete in the Southern Indiana Athletic Conference. Their school colors are white and blue.  The following IHSAA sanctioned sports are offered:

Baseball (boys')
State champions - 1978, 1989, 1993
Basketball (boys' and girls')
Girls' state champions - 2011
Cross country (boys' and girls')
Football (boys')
State champions - 2017, 2019
Golf (boys' and girls')
Soccer (boys & girls)
Boys' state champions - 2007, 2008, 2016, 2017, 2019, 2020
Girls' state champions - 1996, 2008, 2012, 2017, 2021, 2022
Softball (girls)
State champions - 2002
Swimming (boys' and girls')
Tennis (boys' and girls')
Girls' state champions - 1991, 1993, 1994, 1995, 1996, 2012
Track (boys' and girls')
Volleyball (girls')
Wrestling (boys')
RMHS also competes in the National Archery in the Schools Program, placing 4th, 2nd, 2nd, and 2nd in the 2016-2019 Indiana NASP State Tournaments, as well as placing 1st in the 2018 Centershot Ministries World Tournament.

Notable alumni

Athletics
 Don Mattingly: Former MLB New York Yankees first baseman (1982 – 1995) and coach (2004 – 2007); former MLB Los Angeles Dodgers coach (2008 – 2010) and former MLB Miami Marlins manager (2011 – 2022).
 Larry Stallings: Former NFL St Louis Cardinals linebacker (1963 – 1976); Pro Bowl 1970.
 Billy Hillenbrand: Former All-American halfback for the NCAA Indiana Hoosiers; AAFC football player (1946–48) for the Chicago Rockets and Baltimore Colts (1946 – 1948).
 Kyle Kuric: Former NCAA basketball player at the University of Louisville (2008 – 2012); professional with Spanish League club Asefa Estudiantes in Spain (2012 – 2014); current shooting guard/small forward with professional Herbalife Gran Canaria (2014 – present).
 Bob Hargrave: Quarterback of the 1937 Mythical National Championship football team (for Memorial), Honorable mention All-American Quarterback for the University of Notre Dame.
 Jeff Schulz: Former MLB outfielder for The Kansas City Royals (1989–90) and Pittsburgh Pirates (1991).
 Scott Cannon: Former professional soccer player in Major League Soccer, American Professional Soccer League, National Professional Soccer League, and USL; current Director of Coaching for Black Watch Premier (Rhode Island).
 Max Lachowecki: Professional soccer player for the Tampa Bay Rowdies of the USL Championship.

Business
 William C. Stone: Founder, Chairman and CEO of SS&C Technologies.

Entertainment
 Jama Williamson: theater and television actress, she appeared as Wendy Haverford on NBC's Parks and Recreation.
 Philip Lawrence: Songwriter, record producer, entrepreneur, and voice actor best known for his work with the songwriting and production team The Smeezingtons, alongside Bruno Mars.

Politics
 Jonathan Weinzapfel: 33rd mayor of Evansville, Indiana (2004 – 2012); Chancellor of Ivy Tech.
 Jeff Hays: member of the Indiana House of Representatives from 1970 to 1996.

See also
 List of high schools in Indiana

References

External links
 Official school website

High schools in Southwestern Indiana
Educational institutions established in 1925
Catholic secondary schools in Indiana
Private high schools in Indiana
Roman Catholic Diocese of Evansville
Schools in Evansville, Indiana
Southern Indiana Athletic Conference
1925 establishments in Indiana